Engina australis is a species of sea snail, a marine gastropod mollusk in the family Pisaniidae.

Distribution
This species occurs in the Indian Ocean off the Aldabra Atoll.

References

Taylor, J.D. (1973). Provisional list of the mollusca of Aldabra Atoll.

Pisaniidae
Gastropods described in 1871